The Moyer Baronetcy, of Petsey Hall in the County of Essex, was a title in the Baronetage of England. It was created on 25 March 1701 for Samuel Moyer, a London merchant. He was the son of Samuel Moyer, also a merchant, and High Sheriff of Essex in 1698. The title became extinct on Moyer's death in 1716.

Moyer baronets, of Petsey Hall (1701)
Sir Samuel Moyer, 1st Baronet (–1716)

References

Extinct baronetcies in the Baronetage of England